Morava Peak is the peak rising to 966 m in the northeast extremity of Trakiya Heights on Trinity Peninsula, Antarctic Peninsula.  Situated 1.72 km northeast of Mount Daimler, 4.94 km east of Irakli Peak and 6.1 km south-southwest of Gigen Peak.  Surmounting Russell East Glacier to the north and east.

The peak is named after the settlement of Morava in northern Bulgaria.

Location
German-British mapping in 1996.

Maps
 Trinity Peninsula. Scale 1:250000 topographic map No. 5697. Institut für Angewandte Geodäsie and British Antarctic Survey, 1996.
 Antarctic Digital Database (ADD). Scale 1:250000 topographic map of Antarctica. Scientific Committee on Antarctic Research (SCAR). Since 1993, regularly updated.

References
 Bulgarian Antarctic Gazetteer. Antarctic Place-names Commission. (details in Bulgarian, basic data in English)
 Morava Peak. SCAR Composite Antarctic Gazetteer

External links
 Morava Peak. Copernix satellite image

Mountains of Trinity Peninsula
Bulgaria and the Antarctic